"More of You" is a 2014 song by Colton Dixon.

More of You may also refer to  

"More of You", a song by Chris Stapleton from the 2015 album Traveller
"More of You", a song by Goo Goo Dolls from the 2013 album Magnetic
"More of You", a song by Josh Groban from the 2018 album Bridges
"More of You", a song by Mozella
"More of You", a song by Pat Boone from the 1981 album Just the Way I Am
"More of You", a song by Wayne Watson
More of You, Lord – Praise with Don Moen Volume 2, an album by Don Moen

See also
"I Need More of You", a song by The Bellamy Brothers